Pedro Bustos (born 10 November 1927) is an Argentine former basketball player.

References

1927 births
Living people
Argentine men's basketball players
Basketball players at the 1951 Pan American Games
Pan American Games silver medalists for Argentina
Pan American Games medalists in basketball
FIBA World Championship-winning players
Medalists at the 1951 Pan American Games
1950 FIBA World Championship players
Place of birth missing (living people)